The Martyrdom of Simeon is an account concerning the martyrdom of Simeon or Shemon Bar Sabbae, a leader in the Church of the East under the Sasanian Empire. It is one of four Syriac martyr acts, and also known by its longer name, The Martyrdom of Mar Simeon, the Archbishop of the Church of the East. It is not to be confused with the History of Simeon, another narrative about the same individual. There are conflicting chronological notes in the relevant ancient sources, but the death of Simeon must be placed in the neighborhood of 344 CE.

According to the Martyrdom, Simeon was killed primarily for refusing to collect taxes from the Christians for Shapur II, the head of the Sasanian Empire, to be used in fighting against the Romans. The tax would have doubled the level of taxation on the (according to Simeon) poor Christian community of the Sasanian Empire, who were sympathetic to the recently Christianized Roman Empire.

An account of the martyrdom of Simeon was later included in Foxe's influential Book of Martyrs.

Notes

References  

Texts in Syriac
4th-century Christian martyrs
Christianity in the Sasanian Empire